The 1987–88 Eastern Michigan Hurons men's basketball team represented Eastern Michigan University during the 1987–88 NCAA Division I men's basketball season. The Hurons, led by head coach Ben Braun, played their home games at Bowen Field House and were members of the Mid-American Conference. They finished the season 22–8, 14–2 in MAC play. They were MAC Regular season and MAC tournament champions, and received an automatic bid to the NCAA tournament as No. 15 seed in the Midwest region. Making the first NCAA Tournament appearance in school history, the Hurons fell to No. 2 seed Pittsburgh in the opening round.

Roster

Source:

Schedule and results 

|-
!colspan=9 style=| Regular season

|-
!colspan=9 style=| MAC tournament

|-
!colspan=9 style=| NCAA tournament

References

Eastern Michigan Eagles men's basketball seasons
Eastern Michigan
Eastern Michigan
Eastern Michigan Eagles Men's Basketball
Eastern Michigan Eagles Men's Basketball